Dame Judi Dench is an English actress who has worked in theatre, television, and film. Dench made her professional debut in 1957 with the Old Vic Company. Over the following few years, she played in several of Shakespeare's plays in such roles as Ophelia in Hamlet, Juliet in Romeo and Juliet, and Lady Macbeth in Macbeth. She branched into film work, and won a BAFTA Award as Most Promising Newcomer; however, most of her work during this period was in theatre.

Over the next two decades, she established herself as one of the most significant British theatre performers, working for the National Theatre Company and the Royal Shakespeare Company. In television, she achieved success during this period, in the series A Fine Romance from 1981 until 1984 and in 1992 began a continuing role in the television romantic comedy series As Time Goes By. 

Her film appearances were infrequent until she was cast as M in GoldenEye (1995), a role she continued to play in James Bond in films through to Spectre. She has starred in many acclaimed films since then, and won an Academy Award as Best Supporting Actress in 1999 for Shakespeare in Love.

Filmography

Film

Television

Theatre 

Source: Judi Dench: With a Crack in her Voice by John Miller

Other appearances

Video games

See also

References 
 General

External links 

 
 
 
 

Actress filmographies
British filmographies